is the oldest member of the Japanese pop group Speed, which disbanded in 2000 and reformed in 2009. She was born in Okinawa, Japan, and is also known purely by her first name, Hitoe.

In 1999, Arakaki released her first solo single, "Inori", which topped the Oricon charts at No.2. In December 2002, she released her second single, "I Got You", and the album I'll Do It My Way. Besides "Inori", all tracks on the album were co-written by her. In February 2003, she released her third single, "I'll Do It My Way".

Discography

Singles
 Inori (1999)
 I Got You (2002)
 I'll Do It My Way (2003)

Albums
 I'll Do It My Way (2002)

References

External links 
 
 Official blog

1981 births
Living people
People from Okinawa Prefecture
Japanese women pop singers
Japanese idols
Avex Group artists
Japanese pop musicians
Musicians from Okinawa Prefecture
21st-century Japanese singers
21st-century Japanese women singers